Events in the year 1955 in Argentina.

Incumbents
President: Juan Peron until September 21, Eduardo Lonardi until November 12, Pedro Eugenio Aramburu
Vice President: Alberto Teisaire until September 23, Isaac Rojas

Governors
Buenos Aires Province: 
 until 25 September: Carlos Aloé 
 25 September-10 November: Arturo Ossorio Arana
 from 10 November: Juan María Mathet
Cordoba: Raúl Lucini
Mendoza Province: 
 until 15 September: Carlos Horacio Evans 
 15 September-13 December: Roberto Nazar
 from 13 December: Héctor Ladvocat

Vice Governors
 Buenos Aires Province: vacant

Events
June 16 - Bombing of Plaza de Mayo: failed attempt by Argentine Naval Aviation to overthrow President Peron
September 16 - Revolución Libertadora: Peron overthrown
September-Major General Eduardo Lonardi took office as president. He wanted to rebuild the democratic government, but was overthrown.
September- Major General Pedro Eugenio Aramburu overthrew Lonardi.

Births

Deaths
June 16 - Benjamín Gargiulo, vice-admiral, suicide

See also
List of Argentine films of 1955

References

 
Years of the 20th century in Argentina